Seth Lipsky (born 1946) is the founder and editor of the New York Sun, an independent conservative daily in New York City that ceased its print edition on September 30, 2008.  Lipsky counts Ronald Reagan, Margaret Thatcher, Winston Churchill, Ariel Sharon, and Milton Friedman among his intellectual and ideological heroes. He has a long history of working in the newspaper business, including "a nearly 20-year-long career" at the Wall Street Journal that included Asia and Belgium. 

Lipsky also founded and was editor of The Forward, an English-language successor to a Yiddish-language longtime newspaper of the same name.

He has also written several invited articles and guest opinions for The New York Times, and is the author of six books.

Early life
Born 1946 in Brooklyn, from age one Lipsky was "raised in a secular Jewish family in Great Barrington, Mass" and graduated from Harvard University. in 1968.

The Jewish Daily Forward

In 1990, Lipsky started an English-language version of The Jewish Daily Forward (The Forward), which was previously a widely read Yiddish-language daily newspaper. Lipsky resigned in 2000 after a clash with the owners of The Forward, who threatened to shut down the English-language publication unless Lipsky was fired. The dispute was over Lipsky's editorials supporting Ronald Reagan and the war in Vietnam.

The New York Sun

In 2002 he founded and began serving as editor of The New York Sun. Although the paper only lasted six years, and gave away more copies than it sold, but a spokesperson at the United Nations admitted, after a criticism by The Sun, that the paper "does punch way above its circulation number, on occasion." Lipsky's
problems were compounded in that he began and operated at a time when the newspaper industry's situation was described as "pretty grim."

Among its noteworthy "social life" features were the paper's Along the Wine Trail wine column  and crossword puzzle.

Shutting down the print edition
When it was time to give his 110 full-time employees the bad news, he made it "'in an orderly way' ..  not filing for bankruptcy .. pay employees through November .. health insurance .. through Dec. 31." When asked why the shutdown, Lipsky said "we needed additional funds ... 
the 2008 financial collapse was sweeping the world, and the Internet was emerging as a challenge to traditional newspapering."

Books
Among the books he authored are:
 The Citizens Constitution: An Annotated Guide
 The Rise of Abraham Cahan
 The Floating Kilogram

Teaching
A 2011 interview's overview listed second "teaching at Columbia University's School of Journalism."

Personal
Lipsky served in the U.S. Armed Forces and wrote for Stars and Stripes while in Vietnam.  He is married to Amity Shlaes, a columnist and author.

References

External links
 The New York Sun
 Biography page from the Wall Street Journal

1946 births
Living people
Place of birth missing (living people)
Date of birth missing (living people)
The Wall Street Journal people
The New York Sun people
American newspaper editors
21st-century American newspaper founders
Harvard University alumni
American people of Jewish descent